The 2014 Amstel Gold Race was the 49th running of the Amstel Gold Race, a single-day cycling race. It was won for the third time by Belgium's Philippe Gilbert, ahead of countryman Jelle Vanendert and Australia's Simon Gerrans.

Teams
As the Amstel Gold Race was a UCI World Tour event, all 18 UCI ProTeams were invited automatically and obligated to send a squad. Six other squads were given wildcard places, thus completing the 24-team peloton.

The 24 teams competed in the race were:

Results

References

External links

Amstel Gold Race
2014 UCI World Tour
2014 in Dutch sport